Valentyn Mykolayovych Rubchynskyi (born 15 February 2002) is a Ukrainian professional footballer who plays as a central midfielder for Dnipro-1.

Career

Early years
Born in Lutsk, Rubchynskyi is a product of Dnipro academy.

Dnipro
In January 2018, he was promoted to the senior squad of Dnipro, and played in the Ukrainian Second League.

Dnipro-1
In February 2019, he joined another club from Dnipro – Dnipro-1 and made his debut for the club in the winning match against Sumy on 12 April 2019 in the Ukrainian First League as a second-half substitute player.

References

External links
 
 

2002 births
Living people
Footballers from Lutsk
Ukrainian footballers
Ukraine youth international footballers
Association football midfielders
FC Dnipro players
FC Nikopol players
SC Dnipro-1 players
Ukrainian Premier League players
Ukrainian First League players
Ukrainian Second League players
Dnipro Academy people